Charles or Charlie Noble may refer to:

 Charles Noble (cricketer) (1850–1927), English cricketer
 Charles Albert Noble (1867–1962), American mathematician
 Charles C. Noble (1916–2003), American general and engineer who worked on the Manhattan Project
 Charles Sherwood Noble (1873–1957), invented a minimum disturbance cultivator called the Noble blade
 Charles Noble (politician) (1797–1874), Michigan politician
 Charles Wycliffe Noble (1925–2017), musician and architect
 Charlie Noble (chimney), the smoke stack on a ship's galley
 Charlie Noble (visual effects artist), British visual effects artist